The 2015 Rally Guanajuato México was a motor racing event for rally cars that was held over four days between 5 and 8 March 2015. It marked the twenty-ninth running of the Rally Mexico, and was the third round of the 2015 World Rally Championship and WRC-2 seasons.

For the third year in succession, Volkswagen Motorsport driver Sébastien Ogier won the rally, taking his fifth consecutive WRC win in the process. Ogier finished almost a minute-and-a-half clear of his closest competitor, Citroën World Rally Team's Mads Østberg. The podium was completed by Ogier's team-mate Andreas Mikkelsen, who finished 6.3 seconds in arrears of Østberg. Nasser Al-Attiyah was the winner of the WRC-2 class, finishing almost eight minutes clear of anyone else, while also finishing in seventh place overall. Nicolás Fuchs (ninth overall) and Jari Ketomaa (tenth overall) completed the podium.

During the third stage of the rally, Los Mexicanos, Ott Tänak crashed his car into a lake, but he and co-driver Raigo Mõlder were able to extract themselves from the car prior to it submerging. The car was recovered from the lake, in anticipation for the car to be repaired by the M-Sport World Rally Team. The team attempted to repair the car, dubbed the TiTänak – a portmanteau of the RMS Titanic passenger liner, that sank in 1912, and Tänak's name – for the second day, but he was unable to start. He returned for Sunday's stages, finishing 22nd overall and scoring a manufacturers' championship point.

Entry list

Results

Event standings

Special stages

Championship standings after the race

WRC

Drivers' Championship standings

Manufacturers' Championship standings

Other

WRC2 Drivers' Championship standings

WRC3 Drivers' Championship standings

JWRC Drivers' Championship standings

References

External links
 
 The official website of the World Rally Championship

Mexico
Rally Mexico
Rally Mexico
March 2015 sports events in Mexico